The Grand Prix der Volksmusik (English: Grand Prix of Folk Music) was an annual regional song contest for folk music, held from 1986 until 2010. The countries taking part were Germany, Austria, Switzerland and, from 2000, South Tyrol.

History
The competition, established by Hans Beierlein (Hans Rudolf Beierlein), began with Germany, Austria and Switzerland in 1986, and the first year it was held in Vienna. In 1989, the German singer Stefan Mross won the contest competing for Austria. In 1990, the South Tyrol group Kastelruther Spatzen won the contest competing for Germany. In 1995, Géraldine Olivier won the contest for Switzerland after having won the Swiss national contest for the 1992 Eurovision Song Contest with Soleil, soleil, which was disqualified before the contest was held. South Tyrol competed from 2000, when they won at their first attempt.

Production
The program was produced by the Arbeitsgemeinschaft zur Förderung der musikalischen Unterhaltung (English: Working Group for the Advancement of Musical Entertainment) as a coproduction of ZDF, SF DRS, ORF and  Rai. The target demographic of the production was adults aged over 40. Each of the four countries competing sent in four entries.

Winners
1986 Vienna: Nella Martinetti (Switzerland) – Bella Musica
1987 Hanover: Maja Brunner (Switzerland) – Das kommt uns spanisch vor
1988 Zürich: Original Naabtal Duo (West Germany) – Patrona Bavariae
1989 Linz: Stefan Mross (Austria) – Heimwehmelodie
1990 Saarbrücken: Kastelruther Spatzen (West Germany) – Tränen passen nicht zu dir
1991 Innsbruck: Alpentrio Tirol (Austria) – Hast a bisserl Zeit für mi
1992 Zürich: Stefanie Hertel (Germany) – Über jedes Bacherl geht a Brückerl
1993 Rostock: Die jungen Klostertaler (Austria) – An a Wunder hob i g'laubt
1994 Zürich: Henry Arland with Hansi and Maxi (Germany) – Echo der Berge
1995 Vienna: Géraldine Olivier (Switzerland) – Nimm dir wieder einmal Zeit
1996 Mainz: Daniela und Dirk (Switzerland) – Monte Cristallo
1997 Zürich: Sandra Weiss (Switzerland) – Ich suche nicht das Paradies
1998 Vienna: Francine Jordi (Switzerland) – Das Feuer der Sehnsucht
1999 Erfurt: Monique (Switzerland) – Einmal so, einmal so
2000 Zürich: Oswald Sattler and Jantje Smit (South Tyrol) – Ich zeig dir die Berge
2001 Vienna: Marianne Cathomen (Switzerland) – Hey Baby, küss mich noch mal
2002 Meran: Nockalm Quintett and Stephanie (Austria) – Dort auf Wolke Sieben
2003 Rust: Marc Pircher (Austria) – Hey Diandl, spürst es so wia i
2004 Vienna: Die Ladiner (Italy, South Tyrol) – Beuge dich vor grauem Haar
2005 Zürich: Die Psayrer mit Barbara (Italy, South Tyrol) – Berge im Feuer
2006 Munich: Rudy Giovannini, Belsy and the Coro Monti Pallidi (Italy, South Tyrol) – Salve Regina
2007 Vienna: Sigrid & Marina with the Zillertaler Haderlumpen (Austria) – Alles hat zwei Seiten
2008 Zürich: Die Klostertaler (Austria) – Heimat ist dort wo die Berge sind
2009 Munich: Vincent und Fernando (Italy, South Tyrol) – Der Engel von Marienberg
2010 Vienna: Belsy and Florian Fesl (Germany) - I hab Di gern

References

External links

Grand Prix der Volksmusik - Arbeitsgemeinschaft zur Förderung der musikalischen Unterhaltung

1990s German television series
2000s German television series
1986 German television series debuts
2010 German television series endings
Awards established in 1986
German folk music
German language
Song contests
1986 establishments in Austria
German-language television shows
ZDF original programming